Anouk Denton (born 9 May 2003) is an English footballer who plays as a defender for West Ham United in the FA Women's Super League. Educated at St Albans Girls' School, St Albans, Hertfordshire; Denton was signed by Arsenal Ladies to their academy and made her first team debut in 2020. In May 2021, Denton committed to the University of Louisville as part of their recruiting class of 2021.

Career

Arsenal 2016–2020 
Denton started playing football in the youth teams at St Albans City. She also played for St Albans Girls' School which occasionally had coaching from Arsenal Ladies players such as Leah Williamson. Whilst she was there, she was scouted by Arsenal Ladies. As a result, Denton joined their academy in 2016. She was part of a team representing Arsenal that finished second at a girl's youth tournament at Everton's Goodison Park. In 2019, she represented the England women's national under-17 football team at the 2019 UEFA Women's Under-17 Championship. In 2020, due to an injury crisis at Arsenal, Denton was named on the bench for Arsenal's FA WSL match against Brighton & Hove Albion Women but did not play. She made her Arsenal debut after coming on as a substitute in the North London derby against Tottenham Hotspur Women at Meadow Park which Arsenal won 6–1.

West Ham United (loan) 2021 
On 16 May 2021 Denton scored her first senior level goal in West Ham's 5–1 loss to Manchester City.

West Ham United 2023– 
On 21 January it was confirmed that Denton had rejoined West Ham following a spell in the US at Louisville Cardinals in college. It was announced that she had signed a two and a half year deal with the London club.

References 

Living people
2003 births
Arsenal W.F.C. players
English women's footballers
West Ham United F.C. Women players
Women's association football defenders
Sportspeople from St Albans
England women's youth international footballers
Louisville Cardinals women's soccer players